The 1929 Tour de France was the 23rd edition of Tour de France, one of cycling's Grand Tours. The Tour began in Paris with a flat stage on 30 June, and Stage 12 occurred on 13 July with a team time trial from Marseille. The race finished in Paris on 28 July.

Stage 12
15 July 1929 — Marseille to Cannes,  (TTT)

Stage 13
16 July 1929 — Cannes to Nice,

Stage 14
18 July 1929 — Nice to Grenoble,

Stage 15
20 July 1929 — Grenoble to Evian,

Stage 16
22 July 1929 — Evian to Belfort,

Stage 17
23 July 1929 — Belfort to Strasbourg,

Stage 18
24 July 1929 — Strasbourg to Metz,

Stage 19
25 July 1929 — Metz to Charleville,  (TTT)

Stage 20
26 July 1929 — Charleville to Malo-les-Bains,  (TTT)

Stage 21
27 July 1929 — Malo-les-Bains to Dieppe,

Stage 22
28 July 1929 — Dieppe to Paris,

References

1929 Tour de France
Tour de France stages